Herta Bothe (3 January 1921 – 16 March 2000) was a German concentration camp guard during World War II. She was imprisoned for war crimes after the defeat of Nazi Germany, and was subsequently released early from prison on 22 December 1951.

Life
Herta Bothe was born in Teterow, Mecklenburg-Schwerin. In 1938, at the age of seventeen, Bothe helped her father in his small Teterow wood shop, then worked temporarily in a factory, then as a hospital nurse. In 1939, Bothe was a member of the League of German Girls.

Guard at Ravensbrück-Stutthof
In September 1942, Bothe became the SS-Aufseherin camp guard at the Nazi German Ravensbrück concentration camp for women. The former nurse took a four-week training course and was sent as an overseer to the Stutthof camp near Danzig (now Gdańsk). There she became known as the "Sadist of Stutthof" due to her brutal beatings of prisoners.

In July 1944, she was sent by Oberaufseherin Gerda Steinhoff to the Bromberg-Ost (Bromberg East) subcamp.

On 21 January 1945, the 24-year-old Bothe accompanied a death march of women prisoners from central Poland to the Bergen-Belsen concentration camp near Celle. While en route to Bergen-Belsen, she and the prisoners stayed temporarily at Auschwitz concentration camp, arriving at Belsen between 20–26 February 1945.

Guard at Bergen-Belsen

Once in the camp Bothe supervised a group of sixty women prisoners. The camp was liberated on 15 April 1945.

She is said to have been the tallest woman arrested; she was 6' 3" (1.91 m) in height. Bothe also stood out from other Aufseherinnen because, while most of the SS women wore black jackboots, she was in ordinary civilian shoes. The Allied soldiers forced her to place corpses of dead prisoners into mass graves adjacent to the main camp. She recalled in an interview some sixty years later that, while carrying the corpses, they were not allowed to wear gloves, and she was terrified of contracting typhus. She said the dead bodies were so rotten that the arms and legs tore away when they were moved. She also recalled the emaciated bodies were still heavy enough to cause her considerable back pain. Bothe was arrested and taken to a prison at Celle.

At the Belsen Trial she was characterized as a "ruthless overseer" and sentenced to ten years in prison for using a pistol on prisoners. Bothe admitted to striking inmates with her hands for camp violations like stealing but maintained that she never beat anyone "with a stick or a rod" and added that she never "killed anyone." Her contention of innocence was deemed questionable as one Bergen-Belsen survivor claimed to have witnessed Bothe beat a Hungarian Jew named Éva to death with a wooden block while another teenager stated that he saw her shoot two prisoners for reasons he could not understand. Nevertheless, she was released early from prison on 22 December 1951.

Later life and death

During an interview that was recorded in 1999 but not broadcast until some years later, Bothe (living in Germany under the name Lange) became defensive when asked about her decision to be a concentration camp guard. She replied:

Bothe died in March 2000 at the age of 79.

See also
 List of Nazis
 Female guards in Nazi concentration camps

References

External links
 
 
 

1921 births
2000 deaths
Female guards in Nazi concentration camps
People convicted in the Belsen trial
People from the Free State of Mecklenburg-Schwerin
People from Teterow
Ravensbrück concentration camp personnel
Stutthof concentration camp personnel